Mikheytsevo is a rural locality (a village) in Pekshinskoye Rural Settlement, Petushinsky District, Vladimir Oblast, Russia. The population was 37 as of 2010. There are 9 streets.

Geography 
Mikheytsevo is located 17 km northeast of Petushki (the district's administrative centre) by road. Lipna is the nearest rural locality.

References 

Rural localities in Petushinsky District